Huangge Station is an elevated station of Line 4 of the Guangzhou Metro. It started operations on 30 December 2006. It is located at the junction of Huangge Avenue and Shinan Road in the town of Huangge, Nansha District.

Station layout

Exits

References

Railway stations in China opened in 2006
Guangzhou Metro stations in Nansha District